Saint-Senoch is a commune in the Indre-et-Loire department in central France.

History
Its name refers to Saint Senoch, a sixth-century hermit and abbot.

Population

See also
Communes of the Indre-et-Loire department

References

Communes of Indre-et-Loire
Indre-et-Loire communes articles needing translation from French Wikipedia